Holland Township is a civil township of Missaukee County in the U.S. state of Michigan. The population was 248 at the 2010 census.

Communities 
It was named for storekeeper Charles L. Dolph, who became the first postmaster on April 13, 1898. The post office was discontinued on June 15, 1926. 
The first settlers here, the White family, arrived in 1875 but later moved away. Wynand Modders and his family moved here in 1878 and were soon followed by others, many of whom, like the Modders, were from the Netherlands. When a post office was established on August 6, 1890, it was named for the Modders and Wynand became the first postmaster. The office was discontinued on October 31, 1934.  In the 1920s, Moddersville was on the route of M-74.

Geography 

Portions of the Muskegon River flow through Holland Township.

Demographics 
As of the census of 2000, there were 223 people, 95 households, and 68 families residing in the township. The racial makeup of the township was 99.55% White, and 0.45% from two or more races. Hispanic or Latino of any race were 1.35% of the population.

There were 95 households, out of which 25.3% had children under the age of 18 living with them, 65.3% were married couples living together, 4.2% had a female householder with no husband present, and 27.4% were non-families. 24.2% of all households were made up of individuals, and 13.7% had someone living alone who was 65 years of age or older. The average household size was 2.35 and the average family size was 2.74.

In the township the population was spread out, with 19.7% under the age of 18, 7.2% from 18 to 24, 29.1% from 25 to 44, 26.5% from 45 to 64, and 17.5% who were 65 years of age or older. The median age was 41 years. For every 100 females, there were 104.6 males. For every 100 females age 18 and over, there were 101.1 males.

The median income for a household in the township was $31,000, and the median income for a family was $31,500. Males had a median income of $36,875 versus $20,625 for females. The per capita income for the township was $16,200. About 10.7% of families and 11.9% of the population were below the poverty line, including 15.2% of those under the age of eighteen and 16.3% of those 65 or over.

References 

Townships in Missaukee County, Michigan
Townships in Michigan